Peter O'Rourke (1 June 1873 – 10 January 1956) was a Scottish football player and manager. In two spells as manager of Bradford City, he won the FA Cup in 1911 as well as two league titles, the Football League Second Division in 1908 and the Third Division North in 1929.

Career
O'Rourke was a centre half who played for Celtic, Burnley, Lincoln City, Third Lanark and Chesterfield before his final playing days at Bradford City. He became player-manager in 1905 following the departure of Robert Campbell while he was still captain. He was given the job permanently and in December 1905 played his final game in an FA Cup tie against Darlington.

He led the Bantams to the Second Division championship in 1908. Three years later, O'Rourke clinched the FA Cup with Bradford in 1911, beating Newcastle United 1–0 in a replay. His son, Francis, died in Newfoundland in October 1919, affecting him deeply, and in June 1921, due to ill health, O'Rourke retired from the game.

He came back with Welsh side Pontypridd in 1922 for five months. In December of that year, O'Rourke joined Dundee Hibernian, who were then a non-league club, but stayed for only three months, resigning after lacking financial support. His next managerial job was with Bradford Park Avenue from 1924 to 1925. He spent just ten months at Park Avenue but signed another son, Peter, who scored twice on his debut against Durham City.

He returned to Bradford City in 1928, winning the Third Division North the following year. After leaving Bradford for the second time in 1930, he moved to Walsall, before a final managerial spell with Llanelli. He retired in July 1933.

After retiring, O'Rourke returned to Bradford living in Burlington Terrace next to City's Valley Parade ground until he died in January 1956 at the age of 82.

Honours

Manager
Bradford City
 Football League Second Division: 1907–08
 FA Cup: 1910–11
 Football League Third Division North: 1928–29

References

External links
 Bradford City website profile
 

1873 births
1956 deaths
Scottish footballers
Footballers from North Lanarkshire
Celtic F.C. players
Burnley F.C. players
Lincoln City F.C. players
Third Lanark A.C. players
Chesterfield F.C. players
Bradford City A.F.C. players
Association football central defenders
Scottish football managers
Bradford City A.F.C. managers
Dundee United F.C. managers
Bradford (Park Avenue) A.F.C. managers
Walsall F.C. managers
English Football League players
English Football League managers
Scottish Football League managers
Scottish Football League players
Scottish Junior Football Association players
Scotland junior international footballers
People from Newmains
Scottish people of Irish descent